Arthur Fox may refer to:
 Arthur Fox (fencer) (1878–1958), English-American fencer
 Arthur Fox, Sr. (1894–1933), former Australian rules footballer
 Arthur Fox, Jr. (1924–1953), former Australian rules footballer
 Arthur Aloysius Fox (1847–1901), landowner and politician in the colony of South Australia
 Arthur Fox (1907 – 1970), striptease impresario
 Arthur Fox (bishop), former Bishop of Sale (1967–1981) in Victoria, Australia

See also